Seigneurs and Dukes of Retz owned the district of Retz or Rais, is in South Brittany.

History

From the Chabot family the lordship passed to the Lavals. Gilles de Laval, sire de Retz ( 1405–1440), the comrade-in-arms of Joan of Arc and marshal of France, gave himself over to the most revolting debauchery, and was strangled and burned at Nantes.

The barony of Retz passed successively to the families of Tournemine, Annebaut and Gondi. Pierre de Gondi, brother of the first duc de Retz, became bishop of Paris in 1570 and cardinal in 1587. He was succeeded by his nephews, Henri (died 1622) and Jean François de Gondi (died 1654), for whom the episcopal see of Paris was erected into an archbishopric in 1622, and by his great-nephew, Jean François Paul de Gondi, the famous cardinal de Retz.

References

Dukes of France